Matthew Sauk (born March 15, 1976) is an arena football coach and former quarterback. He played college football at Utah State, was an af2 quarterback from 2001 to 2005, and an AFL quarterback from 2002 to 2008. He has been a football coach since 2008. After being the offensive coordinator for the Utah Blaze from 2011 to 2013, he became the Portland Thunder head coach in 2014. He was the head coach of the Salt Lake Screaming Eagles of the Indoor Football League (IFL) in 2017 and the Columbus Destroyers of the Arena Football League in 2019.

Early life
Sauk attended Detroit Catholic Central High School during the 1990–91 school year. Sauk transferred to Woodbridge High School in Irvine, California for his final three years of high school.

College career

Orange Coast College
Sauk attended Orange Coast College after graduation high school, where he continued his football career for the Pirates.

Utah State
Sauk's play at Orange Coast earned him a scholarship to Utah State University, where he continued his football career with the Aggies. Sauk started for two years, earning 2nd Team All-Big West Conference in 1997, while leading the Aggies to the 1997 Humanitarian Bowl.

Professional career
Sauk spent parts of eight seasons bouncing between the af2 and Arena Football League. In 2001, he was named the af2 Rookie of the Year while playing for the Tennessee Valley Vipers. In 2005, he was named the af2 Offensive Player of the Year while playing for the Louisville Fire.

Coaching career

Spokane Shock
Sauk joined the Spokane Shock in 2008 as a quarterback and wide receivers coach. After taking 2009 off, Sauk rejoined the Shock in 2010 as the team's offensive coordinator. The Shock won ArenaBowl XXIII under Sauk's offensive guidance.

Utah Blaze
Sauk joined the Utah Blaze in 2011 as the team's offensive coordinator. During his first two seasons with the Blaze, Sauk was named the Net10 Assistant Coach of the Year, helping quarterback Tommy Grady win the 2012 Arena Football League Most Valuable Player Award.

Portland Thunder
On October 8, 2013, Sauk was named the head coach of the Portland Thunder that began play in 2014. Sauk was let go following a disappointing 5–13 season and a playoff berth.

Los Angeles KISS
Sauk was hired by the Los Angeles KISS in 2015 to be the team's offensive coordinator.

Orlando Predators
On October 19, 2015, Sauk was hired to become the Orlando Predators's offensive coordinator.

Salt Lake Screaming Eagles
On March 6, 2017, Sauk was hired to become the Salt Lake Screaming Eagles's head coach after the third week into the IFL season.

Columbus Destroyers 
On February 22, 2019, Sauk was named Head Coach of the Columbus Destroyers for the team's return to the Arena Football League for the 2019 season.

AFL head coaching record

References

External links
Matt Sauk (coach) at ArenaFan Online
Matt Sauk (player) at ArenaFan Online
Official Website

1976 births
Living people
American football quarterbacks
Spokane Shock coaches
Arizona Rattlers players
Grand Rapids Rampage players
Los Angeles Avengers players
Louisville Fire players
Orange Coast Pirates football players
Philadelphia Soul players
Tennessee Valley Vipers players
Utah State Aggies football players
Utah State University alumni
Orlando Predators coaches
Los Angeles Kiss coaches
Indoor Football League coaches
Portland Thunder coaches
Columbus Destroyers coaches
Utah Blaze coaches